The Young Bloods is an album by trumpeter Donald Byrd and saxophonist Phil Woods recorded in 1956 and released on the Prestige label.

Reception

In his review for Allmusic, Scott Yanow stated: "this is an easily recommended release (despite its brief LP length) for straight-ahead jazz collectors".

Track listing
All compositions by Phil Woods except as indicated
 "Dewey Square" (Charlie Parker) - 7:49  
 "Dupeltook" - 6:46  
 "Once More" - 5:05  
 "House of Chan" - 5:52  
 "In Walked George" - 5:07  
 "Lover Man" (Jimmy Davis, Ram Ramirez, James Sherman) - 5:45

Personnel
Donald Byrd - trumpet
Phil Woods - alto saxophone 
Al Haig - piano
Teddy Kotick - bass 
Charlie Persip - drums

References

Prestige Records albums
Phil Woods albums
Donald Byrd albums
1957 albums
Albums recorded at Van Gelder Studio
Albums produced by Bob Weinstock